Claudio Di Veroli (born 1946) is an Italian-Argentinian harpsichordist who has written several books and papers on baroque performance practice. Born in Buenos Aires, Argentina, he was raised in an Italian family  and attended Italian primary and secondary school. He studied privately in Buenos Aires under  (piano and interpretation),  (harmony) and Ljerko Spiller (chamber music), obtained a degree in Mathematics from the University of Buenos Aires and a PhD in Statistics from Imperial College, London, under the supervision of Prof. Sir David Cox (statistician).

He then returned to Buenos Aires, where he pioneered the performance of Baroque music based on ancient practices. He was Professor of Harpsichord and examiner of the Organ course at the Conservatorio Nacional in Buenos Aires.  As a soloist he has performed extensively in concert halls, churches and television, both solo and with ensembles. After a harpsichord recital a reviewer observed that he "did not miss any detail in order to complete the historical legitimacy of his performance, and also produced a logical, live expressivness". After another concert the same reviewer noted his "virtuosity in the formidable 'Cadenza' of the Fifth Brandenburg Concerto", a performance  which was the world's first contemporary one with Baroque fingerings. He has lived since 2001 in Ireland, where he has offered recitals and masterclasses on the interpretation of Baroque keyboard music. He is also musically active in Italy.

Di Veroli is the author of several books and papers. Favourable reviews have appeared in Stimulus, Early Music America and the British Clavichord Society Newsletter.).

Major works
 Unequal Temperaments and their Role in the Performance of Early Music (1978).
 Baroque Keyboard Fingering: a Method (2008, 2016).
 Unequal Temperaments: Theory, History and Practice (2009, 2017).
 Playing the Baroque Harpsichord: essays on the instrument, interpretation and performance, with relevant topics for the clavichord and organ (2010, 2018).
 Baroque Keyboard Masterpieces Fingered with Baroque Technique (2011).
 J.S. Bach's Six Keyboard Partitas with Baroque Fingerings and a Performance Guide (2015).

References

External links
 Claudio Di Veroli - Personal website
 Claudio Di Veroli  - Facebook page
 Claudio Di Veroli  - Academia.edu list of papers

1946 births
Living people
Baroque musicians
Italian musicologists
Italian harpsichordists
Italian performers of early music
Argentine performers of early music
Argentine musicologists